Archibaccharis schiedeana is a species of shrubs in the family Asteraceae. It is native from Mexico to Panama.

References

External links 
 
 
 Archibaccharis schiedeana at Tropicos

Astereae
Flora of North America
Plants described in 1974